Viertel is a surname. Notable people with the surname include:

 Berthold Viertel (1885–1953), Austrian screenwriter and film director
 Elisabeth Neumann-Viertel (1900–1994), Austrian actress
 Joel Viertel, director of the 2008 comedy film Strictly Sexual
 Peter Viertel (1920–2007), American author and screenwriter
 Salka Viertel (1889–1978), actress and screenwriter

Surnames from status names
Surnames from nicknames